BACE Motorsports was a championship-winning NASCAR team. It was owned by entrepreneur Bill Baumgardner, who also founded Staff America. Baumgardner was inspired to start his own team after Staff America was a sponsor in the Busch Series for two years. The team was famous during its tenure for always running its familiar No. 74.

Beginnings
BACE made its debut in 1993 at the season opening race at Daytona International Speedway. Jack Sprague was the driver, and he finished 44th after the engine expired. After that less-than-stellar debut, Sprague and BACE made a good turn around, and they soon became a consistent top-20 contender, and had three top-10 finishes. After the fall race at Dover International Speedway, BACE and Sprague parted ways, and Winston Cup star Ernie Irvan occupied the car for one race, but another driver took the reins as well, a young short-track driver named Johnny Benson.

Championship years
Steve "Birdie"  Bird was the crew chief, Benson's rookie year with BACE started off slow, as he originally didn't finish higher than 16th. After a long string of finishes 22nd or worse, Benson put together two consecutive top-5 finishes at The Milwaukee Mile and South Boston Speedway, then had three more top-ten finishes before winning his first race at Dover. At the end of 1994, Benson was named the Busch Series Rookie of the Year and was sixth in points. Benson's momentum carried over into the following year. Along with Lipton Tea coming on board as sponsor, Benson won twice early in the season, and finished outside of the top-ten only nine times. The consistency was enough for him to clinch that year's championship. When Benson signed on with Bahari Racing for 1996, veteran Randy LaJoie was tabbed his replacement along with a new sponsor in Fina. LaJoie had no problem adjusting, and he won five times as well as a second straight championship for BACE; then he repeated the performance in 1997. 1997 also saw the appearance of a second BACE car, the No. 33 Kleenex team driven by Tim Fedewa. In two seasons, Fedewa won twice and finished 7th in points in 1998. After a seemingly disappointing 1998 season that saw just one victory and a fourth-place finish in points, LaJoie left for Phoenix Racing while Fedewa signed with Cicci-Welliver Racing, and sponsor Kleenex departed for Progressive Motorsports.

Later years
BACE had an entirely different look in 1999. Alka-Seltzer and Bayer sponsored the 33 car driven by Jason Jarrett, while the rookie Tony Raines drove the unsponsored No. 74. The results were mixed. Raines showed consistency and came out of left field to win Rookie of the Year, while Jarrett was released after the race at California Speedway, and was replaced by a series of rotating drivers including Mike Wallace, Hermie Sadler, and Benson returning to the team briefly. For 2000, Raines slid over to the No. 33, while rookie P. J. Jones signed to drive the 74 car. Raines finished second at South Boston, and finished 15th in points, while the 74 team disappeared briefly due to operating expenses, before Chad Little became the driver towards the end of the year. Raines (No. 33) and Little (No. 74) returned in 2001, and both drivers finished in the top ten in points (Raines-6th, Little-9th). Raines finished 12th in point for the 2002 season in the No. 33. Little started the season out in the unsponsored No. 74 but after the first couple of races that season, BACE decided to make the move to Winston Cup running a part-time schedule in the No. 74 Monte Carlo. After missing several races, Little left the team. Raines drove the rest of the part-time schedule in 2002 and made the move to full-time Cup in 2003. Raines got a sixth-place finish at North Carolina Speedway, but was left in the dust for the Rookie of the Year running. BACE returned to the Busch Series for 2004, but this time, Raines was not their original driver until later in the year, when he replaced Damon Lusk. BACE was forced to cut back to a part-time schedule because of their decreasing finances, and put Jimmy Spencer in the car with a few races to go in the season. In 2005, BACE announced they would temporarily suspend operations but return as soon as sponsorship was found. Its equipment was sold to Kevin Harvick Incorporated, and the team has not been heard from since.

External links
Official website

Auto racing teams established in 1993
Sports clubs disestablished in 2005
Sports teams in Charlotte, North Carolina
Defunct NASCAR teams
American auto racing teams
Defunct companies based in North Carolina
1993 establishments in North Carolina
2005 disestablishments in North Carolina